Football Association of Ireland, Women's (FAI Women's) (formerly the Women's Football Association of Ireland) is the governing body for women's association football in the Republic of Ireland. It is responsible for organising the Republic of Ireland women's national football team, the FAI Women's Cup and the Women's National League as well as various county and regional leagues and junior cup competitions.

History
The WFAI was originally formed in 1973 as the Ladies Football Association of Ireland. It was initially independent of the Football Association of Ireland. In 1991 the LFAI became affiliated to the FAI and in 2001 it adopted the name Women's Football Association of Ireland.
As part of the 2015-2018 FAI Women’s Strategic Plan, there was implementation of a new governance structure for women’s association football in the Republic of Ireland. This saw the Women's Football Association of Ireland fully integrate into the FAI and the formation of a national Women's Football Committee as a key FAI Committee. Eight Women’s Regional Football Committees were also introduced, each made up of stakeholders from all strands of the game within their defined geographical area. These committees oversee the development of women's and girls' football in their areas, in line with the FAI Strategic Plan for Women's Football.

Affiliated leagues
 Women's National League
 Dublin Women's Soccer League
 Mayo Women's Football League
 Metropolitan Girls League

Cup competitions
 FAI Women's Cup

See also
 Irish Universities Football Union
 Connacht Football Association
 Munster Football Association
 Leinster Football Association
 Galway Football Association

References

Women's association football in the Republic of Ireland
Football Association of Ireland
Association football governing bodies in the Republic of Ireland
Sports organizations established in 1973
1973 establishments in Ireland
Football